Estero de Limantour State Marine Reserve (SMR) and Drakes Estero State Marine Conservation Area (SMCA) are two adjoining marine protected areas along the Point Reyes National Seashore in Marin County on California’s north central coast. Drakes Estero SMCA prohibits the take of all living marine resources from Drakes Estero except the recreational take of clams and formerly the commercial aquaculture of shellfish pursuant to a disputed state water bottom lease and permit, which has been the subject of ongoing legal proceedings since 2012, when the lease was allowed to expire.

History

Estero de Limantour State Marine Reserve SMR and Drakes Estero State Marine Conservation Area SMCA are two of 22 marine protected areas adopted by the California Department of Fish and Game in August 2009 during the second phase of the  Marine Life Protection Act Initiative. The MLPAI is a collaborative public process to create a statewide network of protected areas along California’s coastline.

The north central coast’s new marine protected areas were designed by local divers, fishermen, conservationists and scientists who comprised the North Central Coast Regional Stakeholder Group.  Their job was to design a network of protected areas that would preserve sensitive sea life and habitats while enhancing recreation, study and education opportunities.

The north central coast marine protected areas took effect May 1, 2010.

Geography and natural features

Estero de Limantour SMR and Drakes Estero SMCA are two adjoining marine protected areas along the Point Reyes National Seashore in Marin County on California’s north central coast. Estero de Limantour SMR is contiguous to Point Reyes state marine reserve. Point Reyes is a spectacular and biologically diverse peninsula which has been designated a National Seashore.

.

Habitat and wildlife

Estero de Limantour and Drakes Estero serve as nurseries for Dungeness crab and various fish species, as well as seal pupping areas and haul-out sites for marine mammals and major foraging areas for leopard sharks,  bat rays, and many bird species. Estero de Limantour SMR and Drakes Estero SMCA protect complex estuarine habitats, including eelgrass beds and mudflat ecosystems, and reduce disturbances to major mainland seabird colonies and elephant seal rookeries.

Recreation and nearby attractions

Through a haze of salty fog, visitors can see, hear, smell and even feel the thunderous ocean breakers washing over long sandy beaches and crashing into rocky cliffs. Extensive recreational activities include hiking, biking, kayaking, camping and wildlife viewing. There are three visitor centers and extensive ranger-led programs.

Estero de Limantour SMR prohibits the take of all living marine resources. Drakes Estero SMCA prohibits the take of all living marine resources except the recreational take of clams and the commercial aquaculture of shellfish pursuant to a valid state water bottom lease and permit. However, California’s marine protected areas encourage recreational and educational uses of the ocean. Activities such as kayaking, diving, snorkeling, and swimming are allowed unless otherwise restricted.

Scientific monitoring

As specified by the Marine Life Protection Act, select marine protected areas along California’s central coast are being monitored by scientists to track their effectiveness and learn more about ocean health. Similar studies in marine protected areas located off of the Santa Barbara Channel Islands have already detected gradual improvements in fish size and number.

References

External links 
Marine Life Protection Act Initiative
CalOceans
Point Reyes National Seashore

National Seashores of the United States
Parks in Marin County, California
Marine sanctuaries in California